In Greek mythology, Macistus or Makistos (Ancient Greek: Μάκιστος means 'tallest' or 'greatest) may refer to the following person and surname:

 Macistus, a Boeotian prince as the son of King Athamas probably by the cloud-nymph Nephele, thus the brother of Phrixus and Helle. From Macistus, the town of Macistus in Triphylia was believed to have derived its name.
 Makistios, an epithet of Heracles, who had a temple in the neighbourhood of the town of Macistus in Triphylia, Elis (Peloponnese).

See also
Mecisteus

Notes

References

Stephanus of Byzantium, Stephani Byzantii Ethnicorum quae supersunt, edited by August Meineike (1790-1870), published 1849. A few entries from this important ancient handbook of place names have been translated by Brady Kiesling. Online version at the Topos Text Project.
Strabo, The Geography of Strabo. Edition by H.L. Jones. Cambridge, Mass.: Harvard University Press; London: William Heinemann, Ltd. 1924. Online version at the Perseus Digital Library.
Strabo, Geographica edited by A. Meineke. Leipzig: Teubner. 1877. Greek text available at the Perseus Digital Library.

Princes in Greek mythology
Family of Athamas
Boeotian characters in Greek mythology
Boeotian mythology
Epithets of Heracles
Ancient Elis
Doric Greek